Aspen Gold is an album by the American folk music group the Kingston Trio, released in 1979 (see 1979 in music). The group consisted of the line up of Bob Shane, George Grove, and Roger Gambill.

History
Aspen Gold included re-recordings of nine previously released songs done regularly by the Trio in their live act along with two new songs — "Aspen Gold" and "Longest Beer of the Night" — the latter two released as a single but distributed only for radio promotional purposes. The album was minimally distributed and did not chart. It is out of print although Folk Era has essentially reissued the album as Once Again with the inclusion of the 1977 single "Johnson Party of Four" b/w "Big Ship Glory".

Reception

While noting that Once Again is a reissue of Aspen Gold with two additional tracks,  Allmusic critic Steve Leggett noted "It is interesting to hear a hard-charging, drum-paced version of "Greenback Dollar," and both "Aspen Gold" and the group's version of Gordon Lightfoot's classic "Early Morning Rain" are pleasantly done, but Aspen Gold/Once Again is hardly essential unless you're a die-hard fan."

Track listing
"California" was previously recorded under the title "I'm Goin' Home".

Side one
"A Worried Man" (Dave Guard, Tom Glazer) – 2:37
 "Greenback Dollar" (Hoyt Axton, Kennard Ramsey) – 2:20
 "Reuben James" (Woody Guthrie) – 2:38
 "Hard Ain't It Hard'" (Guthrie) – 2:04
 "California" (Fred Geis) – 2:46

Side two
"Aspen Gold" (Harold Payne) – 2:33
 "Early Morning Rain" (Gordon Lightfoot) – 3:06
"Scotch and Soda" (Guard) – 2:17
"M.T.A./Tom Dooley" (Bess Lomax Hawes, Jacqueline Steiner / (Alan Lomax, Frank Warner)  – 4:01
"The Longest Beer of the Night" (Carson Parks) – 2:29

Personnel
Bob Shane – vocals, guitar
Roger Gambill – vocals, guitar
George Grove – vocals, banjo, guitar
Stan Kaess – bass
Tom Green – drums
Ben Schubert – fiddle, mandolin

References

External links
Liner notes for Aspen Gold

1979 albums
The Kingston Trio albums